Lady Li (李夫人, died between 104 and 101 BC), also rendered as Li Fu-jēn, was a Han dynasty concubine of Emperor Wu. Civil unrest broke out between her family and Wei Zifu's family. Moreover, her siblings defected to the Xiongnu and became traitors to China. As a result, Emperor Wu ordered her relatives to be tried and executed, leading to the downfall of her and her family.

Biography

As concubine 
She was allegedly the inspiration for The Beauty Song, composed by her brother Li Yannian.

Lady Li's brother Li Yannian was a musician for Princess Pingyang. After he performed The Beauty Song for Emperor Wu, the Emperor asked Li Yannian if he knew of such a woman, to which Princess Pingyang responded that the song was about Li's sister. The Emperor thus requested to meet with Lady Li, and she became one of his concubines. She had one son named Bo (髆).

However, although composed in the persona of Han Wudi, there is doubt as to the actual authorship of this and similar poems.

Treason and execution of her family 
In the civil unrest between the Li family and Empress Wei Zifu's family, several of Li's relatives were killed and executed. At the time Empress Wei Zifu was the head wife of Liu Che, and Wei and Li were jealous of each other.

Moreover, Li Guangli later surrendered to the Xiongnu circa 90-89 BC and was accused of being a traitor. His grandson Li Ling also defected to the Xiongnu. Li's family was then tried and executed for treason.

With the suicide of Emperor Wu's crown prince Liu Ju in 91 BC, her son Liu Bo was among the candidates for the title of crown prince. However, the title ultimately went to young Liu Fuling, who succeeded Emperor Wu as Emperor Zhao of Han. In any case, Liu Bo predeceased his father. Her grandson, Liu Bo's son, Prince He of Changyi, was enthroned as emperor as Emperor Zhao's successor, but was removed from his position after 27 days by Huo Guang. Li's grandson was impeached on 1127 charges of misconduct committed, and afterwards, Li's grandson was not included on the official historical list of Han emperors.

Death 

At the end of her life, Lady Li became gravely ill. She refused to allow Emperor Wu to see her face, citing the loss of her beauty. Upon Wudi's urging, Li went further and refused to even speak. As such, Wudi left unhappily. The lady's sisters then admonished her for not allowing the emperor to see her face.

The date of Lady Li's death is unrecorded, but is calculated to be between 104 and 101 BC, as her brother Li Guangli was sent to attack Dayuan twice during this period, and it was recorded that Lady Li had passed away before Li Guangli returned from his second expedition. But soon later Li Guangli and Li Ling defected to the Xiongnu, and her family was executed for treason.

Remembrance 
Because of her short but vibrant life, the emperor had her named the goddess of the Hollyhock blossom. She was said to be beautiful and sweet, just like the blossom.

Popular culture
 Portrayed by Zhan Jie in the 1990 TV series Han Wudi
 Portrayed by He Jiayi in the 2000 BMN TV series The Prince of Han Dynasty
 Portrayed by Gao Tingting in the 2005 CCTV TV series The Emperor in Han Dynasty
 Portrayed by Zhang Xuan in the 2014 Zhejiang Huace Film and Now TV collaborative TV series The Virtuous Queen of Han
 Portrayed by Fala Chen in the 2014 HT TV series Sound of the Desert

See also
Hanjian

Notes

References
M. Loewe, Crisis and Conflict in Han China
Rexroth, Kenneth (1970). Love and the Turning Year: One Hundred More Poems from the Chinese. New York: New Directions.
 Book of Han, vol. 97, Part 1.
Records of the Grand Historian, volume 49

100s BC deaths
Year of birth unknown
Year of death uncertain
2nd-century BC Chinese women
2nd-century BC Chinese people
Han dynasty posthumous empresses